Railway line 132 is a double-track, electrified railway line running across the Silesian, Opole and Lower Silesian Voivodeship, and as such serving as the main railway artery between Bytom and Wrocław. Between Opole and Wrocław, the railway line is part of the E-30 Pan-European railway corridor, whilst between Pyskowice and Opole, part of the CE-30 line. The lines form the Third Pan-European railway corridor.  Between Zabrze and Pyskowice, the railway line has been deconstructed.

By 2011, the Bytom-Wrocław line has been modernised for a maximum operational speed of 160 km/h.

Route plan

References

 
Railway lines in Poland